Papagena (minor planet designation: 471 Papagena) is an asteroid that was discovered by German astronomer Max Wolf on June 7, 1901. Its provisional name was 1901 GN.

Papagena comes to a favorable near-opposition apparent magnitude of better than magnitude 9.8 every five years.  On September 30, 2010, it was magnitude 9.68 and it will get brighter every five years until December 12, 2035, when this late-to-be-discovered asteroid will be at magnitude 9.28. It is named for a character in Mozart's opera, The Magic Flute.

References

External links 
 
 

000471
Discoveries by Max Wolf
Named minor planets
471 Papagena
000471
000471
19010607